Polonia, the name for Poland in Latin and many Romance and other languages, is most often used in modern Polish as referring to the Polish diaspora. However, as can be seen from the image, it was also used as a national personification.

The symbolic depiction of a country as a woman called by the Latin name of that country was common in the 19th Century (see Germania, Britannia, Hibernia, Helvetia).

Personifications of Poland in art
Bernardo Morando Polonia, Old Lublin Gate in Zamość, 1588
Ary Scheffer Polonia, 1831
Horace Vernet Polish Prometheus, 1831
Jan Matejko  Polonia, Illustration to Zygmunt Krasiński's "Psalmy Przeszłości" ("Psalms of the past"), 1861
Artur Grottger  Polonia, 1863 
Jan Matejko Rok 1863. Zakuwana Polska ("Year 1863 - Polonia enchained"), 1864
Jan Styka Polonia, 1890–91
Stanisław Wyspiański Polonia, 1892-93. Part of stained-glass design for chancel of Latin Cathedral in Lviv/Lwów (in pastel, never realized in glass)  
Jacek Malczewski In the Dust Cloud, 1893
Jacek Malczewski Hamlet polski - Portret of Aleksander Wielopolski ("Polish Hamlet - Portrait of Aleksander Wielopolski"), 1903 
Jacek Malczewski The Fatherland, 1903  
Włodzimierz Tetmajer Alegoria Polski umarłej ("Allegory of Dead Poland"), St. Nicholas Cathedral in Kalisz, 1909
Jacek Malczewski Polonia, 1914
Władysław Skoczylas Polonia, 1915
Jacek Mierzejewski Polonia, 1915
Jacek Malczewski Polonia II, 1918
Leszek Sobocki Polonia, 1982
Edward Dwurnik Polonia, 1984

Gallery

References

National personifications
History of Poland